1965 Soviet Class B was a Soviet football competition at the Soviet third tier.

Russian Federation

Semifinal Group 1
 [Kaliningrad]

Semifinal Group 2
 [Saratov]

Semifinal Group 3
 [Armavir]

Semifinal Group 4
 [Nalchik]

Final group
 [Nov 13-20, Nalchik]

Ukraine

Second stage for places 1-6

Second stage for places 7-12

Union republics
 [Nov 19-24, Baku]

Additional final
 Dinamo Kirovabad  0-0 Dinamo Baku  
 [Dinamo Kirovabad won by draw]

References
 All-Soviet Archive Site
 Results. RSSSF

Soviet Second League seasons
3
Soviet
Soviet